Selma, Lord, Selma is a 1999 American made-for-television biographical drama film based on true events that happened in March 1965, known as Bloody Sunday in Selma, Alabama. The film tells the story through the eyes of an 9-year-old African-American girl named Sheyann Webb (Jurnee Smollett). It was directed by Charles Burnett, one of the pioneers of African-American independent cinema. It premiered on ABC on January 17, 1999.

Plot
Sheyann Webb sees Dr. Martin Luther King Jr. going into Brown Chapel AME Church one day while playing outside with her friends. They are told that Dr. King has come to Selma, Alabama to help the Negro people get voting rights. Sheyann learns many things from Dr. King. He teaches her and her friend Rachel (Stephanie Zandra Peyton) that when asked, "Children, what do you want?" their answer should be "Freedom." He also teaches her that everyone deserves to be treated with fairness, regardless of the color of their skin, and that children also have a battle to fight. Sheyann wants to get involved and skips school to sneak into the meetings. One night a friend of Sheyann's named Jimmie Lee Jackson is killed. To draw attention to the death of Jimmie Lee Jackson, it is decided that a 54-mile march to the state capital of Alabama will take place. Marchers will present a petition to Governor Wallace to protest that Negroes are not being treated fairly. On Sunday, March 7, 1965, a day that comes to be called Bloody Sunday, Sheyann and other African-American protesters march over the Edmund Pettus Bridge en route to Montgomery, and are attacked by police. Sheyann is the youngest person to attempt to march.

In August, President Lyndon Johnson signs the Voting Rights Act of 1965, to oversee and enforce constitutional rights of suffrage and prevent discriminatory measures, such as use of literacy tests against potential voters.

Cast

Production
Selma, Lord, Selma is based on a book of the same name written in 1980 by Sheyann Webb, Rachel West and Frank Sikora. The full title is Selma, Lord, Selma: Girlhood Memories of the Civil-Rights Days. It was published by the University of Alabama Press in Tuscaloosa, AL. It is written in the style of memoirs by Sheyann and Rachel.

Selma, Lord, Selma was made into a movie. Walt Disney Pictures picked it up and on January 17, 1999, one day prior to the national holiday commemorating Dr. King's birthday, it was broadcast on the ABC television network. Dr. King's daughter Yolanda is featured in the film as Miss Bright, Sheyann's teacher who marches with her. Music composed by Stephen James Taylor, with vocals by Brides of the Wind.

Reception
The Philadelphia Tribune praised the portrayal of Martin Luther King Jr. by Clifton Powell and the "…heart-wrenching performance" by Jurnee Smollett. The Boston Globe criticized it: "…never rises above the level of a Classic Comics version of civil rights history", while The Rocky Mountain News said: "(Selma) …offers a sense of authenticity…".

Awards and nominations
In 1999, Cynthia Whitcomb, the author, was nominated for the Humanitas Prize. The category was Best 90-minute film. The winner was NYPD Blue. Selma, Lord, Selma also was nominated for an Image Award in 2000. The category was Outstanding Television Movie/Miniseries/Dramatic Special.

See also
Civil rights movement in popular culture
Selma, a 2014 film featuring the Selma to Montgomery marches and some of the same events and characters.

References

External links

1999 television films
1999 films
American biographical drama films
Civil rights movement in television
1990s English-language films
Films about Martin Luther King Jr.
Films about race and ethnicity
Drama films based on actual events
Films based on biographies
Films directed by Charles Burnett (director)
Films scored by Stephen James Taylor
Films set in Alabama
Films set in the 1960s
Films shot in Alabama
Selma to Montgomery marches
Disney television films
Films about activists
American drama television films
1990s American films